The Civil Procedure Rules (CPR) were introduced in 1997 as per the Civil Procedure Act 1997 by the Civil Procedure Rule Committee and are the rules of civil procedure used by the Court of Appeal, High Court of Justice, and County Courts in civil cases in England and Wales. They apply to all cases commenced after 26 April 1999, and largely replace the Rules of the Supreme Court and the County Court Rules. The Civil Procedure Rules 1998 is the statutory instrument listing the rules.

The CPR were designed to improve access to justice by making legal proceedings cheaper, quicker, and easier to understand for non-lawyers. As a consequence of this, many archaic legal terms were replaced with plain English equivalents, such as "claimant" for "plaintiff" and "witness summons" for "subpoena".

Unlike the previous rules of civil procedure, the CPR commence with a statement of their "overriding objective", both to aid in the application of specific provisions and to guide behaviour where no specific rule applies.

History
In 1994, the Lord Chancellor instructed the then Master of the Rolls, Lord Woolf, to report on options to consolidate the existing rules of civil procedure. 

On 16 June 1995, Lord Woolf published an interim report on Access to Justice. The interim report was the subject of extensive academic commentary. For example, American law professor Richard Marcus, Jr. pointed out that the interim report was clearly inspired by the experience of the US federal courts with case management, which grew out of their experience with managing complex litigation. During the 1960s, a massive antitrust scandal in the American electrical equipment industry had led to the enactment of a multidistrict litigation statute in 1968 and the creation of the Judicial Panel on Multidistrict Litigation. In 1969, the Panel published the Manual on Complex Litigation, which proposed that American judges should take a more active role in the management and development of complex cases during the pretrial phase of litigation. This recommendation touched off the case management movement of the 1970s and 1980s in American courts. 

On 26 July 1996, Lord Woolf published his final Access to Justice Report 1996 in which he "identified a number of principles the civil justice system should meet to ensure access to justice. The system should –

Lord Woolf listed two of the requirements of case management as "fixing timetables for the parties to take particular steps in the case; and limiting disclosure and expert evidence".

The second thread of the report was to control the cost of litigation, both in time and money, by focusing on key issues rather than every possible issue and limiting the amount of work that has to be done on the case.

The report was accompanied by draft rules of practice designed to implement Lord Woolf's proposals. These rules granted wide management powers to the court, proposed that cases be allocated to one of three tracks depending on their nature, limiting or requiring specific actions, and introduced the concept of proportionality to the costs regime.  

The Civil Procedure Act 1997 (c. 12) was enacted on 27 February 1997. It conferred the power to make civil procedure rules. It also established the Civil Justice Council, a body composed of members of the judiciary, members of the legal professions and civil servants, and charged with reviewing the civil justice system.

The Civil Procedure Rules 1998 (SI 1998/3132) were made on 10 December 1998 and came into force on 26 April 1999. The draft rules of practice formed their core.

The overriding objective 
Implemented as a result of reforms suggested by Lord Woolf and his committee, one of the innovations of the rules is the "overriding objective" embodied in Part 1 of the Rules, which states:

The rules are written to be intelligible not just to lawyers but also to litigants in person.

Assessing proportionality
Two approaches to the assessment of proportionality arose in the case of West v Stockport NHS Foundation Trust (2019), in particular on appeal from the initial trial. The appeal judges referred to a "debate between the parties as to whether a proportionality challenge was limited to the circumstances of the particular case ('the narrower interpretation'), or whether it was to be assessed by reference to all the circumstances, and so encompass matters which were not necessarily related to the case in question ('the wider interpretation')". On a reading of CPR 44, which contains general rules about costs, it was felt to be clear that "questions of proportionality are to be considered by reference to the specific matters noted in 44.3(5) and, if relevant, any wider circumstances identified under r. 44.4(1). Accordingly, the wider interpretation is correct."

Tracks

Small Claims Track

Claims with a value of not more than £10,000 (the amount increased on 1 April 2013) are usually allocated to the Small Claims Track unless: the amount claimed for pain, suffering, and loss of amenity is more than £1,000.00; or the cost of the repairs or other work to residential premises claimed against the landlord by a tenant is estimated to be more than £1,000 – whether or not they are also seeking another remedy – or the financial value of any claim in addition to those repairs is more than £1,000.

A claim for a remedy for harassment or unlawful eviction relating to residential premises will not be allocated to the Small Claims Track even if it meets the financial limits.

Fast Track

Claims with a financial value of no more than £25,000 (£15,000 for claims issued before 6 April 2009) for which the Small Claims Track is not the normal track are usually allocated to the Fast Track unless: the trial is likely to last for more than one day; oral expert evidence at trial will be in more than two fields; or there will be more than one expert per party in each field.

Multi Track

Any case not allocated to either the Small Claims Track or the Fast Track is allocated to the Multi Track.

Pre-action Protocols

To support the ethos of narrowing the issues prior to the use of proceedings and encapsulate best practice, the CPR introduced "pre-action protocols". They are given force by Practice Direction – Protocols

Purpose

Pre-action protocols outline the steps that parties should take in particular types of dispute to seek information from, and to provide information to, each other prior to making a legal claim.

Pre-action protocols, which entails setting out the claim in full to the defendant in an attempt to negotiate a settlement. The emphasis is placed on co-operation to identify the main issues. Failure to co-operate may lead cost penalties, regardless of the eventual outcomes of the case.

Paragraph 1 of the Practice Direction defines the purpose of pre-action protocols as:
 encouraging the early exchange of all information relating to the prospective legal claim
 aiding settlement of the claim without the commencement of proceedings
 producing a foundation for efficient case management where litigation cannot be avoided

Current Pre-action Protocols

This list was last updated on 6 September 2007.

Penalties

Paragraph 2 indicates that the Court may add terms to any order if it feels a party has breached a protocol. These will place parties in the same position as if the breach had not occurred (or as close as possible).

The court may, amongst other remedies, order that the party in breach:
 pay some or all of the costs of another party
 pay costs to another party on an indemnity rather than standard basis
 pay a higher rate of interest on particular damages awarded, or for a particular period.
 forgo interest on a particular item of damages or for a period.

For instance, where a party commences proceedings prior to supplying important information to the other party(s) then the Court might disallow interest for the period prior to the information being provided.

In addition, the protocol might provide grounds to show a party had or had not behaved so unreasonably as to merit penalty under another Rule (for instance CPR 44.3).

Cases not covered by a protocol

Where no protocol has been published Paragraph 4 states that parties should conform to CPR 1 and the Overriding Objective.

It also sets out what would normally be considered reasonable behaviour prior to issue.

Where a case has been commenced prior to the protocol coming into force, but after publication the protocol is not binding. However, the degree to which a party has attempted to follow it anyway might be persuasive.

Creation of the Rules
Section 2 of the Civil Procedure Act 1997 requires that the CPR are made by a committee called the Civil Procedure Rule Committee. Members of the committee consist of:

Ex officio:
 the Master of the Rolls/Head of Civil Justice
 the Deputy Head of Civil Justice (if there is one)

Those appointed by the Lord Chief Justice:
 either two or three judges of the Senior Courts
 one Circuit judge
 either one or two district judges
 one person who is a Master referred to in Part II of Schedule 2 to the Senior Courts Act 1981

Those appointed by the Lord Chancellor:
 three persons who have a Supreme Court qualification (within the meaning of section 71 of the Courts and Legal Services Act 1990 (CLSA)), including at least one with particular experience of practice in county courts
 Three persons who have been authorised by a relevant approved regulator to conduct litigation in relation to all proceedings in the Senior Courts, including at least one with particular experience of practice in county courts
 two persons with experience in and knowledge of the lay advice sector or consumer affairs

The Lord Chancellor's appointments are made in consultation with the Lord Chief Justice and all authorised bodies which have members who are eligible for appointment.

Rulemaking procedure

Rules must be approved by at least eight members of the Committee, and submitted to the Lord Chancellor who may allow or disallow them. Where he decides to disallow, he must express his reasons for doing so in writing.

See also
Civil Jurisdiction and Judgments Act 1982
Lord Woolf
Practice Direction

References

Bibliography
 Dwyer, D, The Civil Procedure Rules Ten Years On, Oxford University Press (2009).

External links
Civil Procedure Rules Committee official website
. To see the Rules as they are in force today, use the "Latest available (Revised)" button on the left.

Codes of civil procedure
1998 in law
English civil law
Statutory Instruments of the United Kingdom